Richard L. Anderson is an American sound effects editor, best known for Raiders of the Lost Ark. He has been nominated twice for sound editing, and received a Special Achievement Academy Award in 1981. 
He has nearly 140 film credits since his start in 1972.

In April 2017, Anderson partnered with Pro Sound Effects to release The Odyssey Collection, developed from his personal sound library built throughout his career with partner Mark Mangini.

Oscar history

1981 Academy Awards-Special Achievement Academy Award for Raiders of the Lost Ark. Shared with Ben Burtt.
1982 Academy Awards-nominated for Best Sound Editing for Poltergeist, nomination shared with Stephen Hunter Flick. Lost to E.T. the Extra-Terrestrial.
1996 Academy Awards-nominated for  Best Sound Editing for Daylight. Nomination shared with David A. Whittaker. Lost to The Ghost and the Darkness.

Selected filmography

Jack the Giant Slayer (2013)
Hop (2011)
New Year's Eve (2011)
Valentine's Day (2010)
Imagine That (2009)
The Spiderwick Chronicles (2008)
Blades of Glory (2007)
Shrek the Third (2007)
Flushed Away (2006)
Over the Hedge (2006)
Madagascar (2005)
Monster-in-Law (2005)
Anchorman: The Legend of Ron Burgundy (2004)
Shark Tale (2004)
Brother Bear (2003)
Legally Blonde 2: Red, White & Blonde (2003)
The Majestic (2001)
Planet of the Apes (2001)
Cats & Dogs (2001)
Disney's The Kid (2000) 
The Flintstones in Viva Rock Vegas (2000)
Being John Malkovich (1999)
Sleepy Hollow (1999)
Virus (1999)
Antz (1998)
Lethal Weapon 4 (1998)
Anastasia (1997)
Conspiracy Theory (1997)
Dante's Peak (1997)
Daylight (1996)
Dragonheart (1996)
Apollo 13 (1995)
The Lion King (1994)
The Nightmare Before Christmas (1993)
Batman Returns (1992)
Hoffa (1992)
Edward Scissorhands (1990)
Tremors (1990)
K-9 (1989)
Cocktail (1988)
Beetlejuice (1988)
Predator (1987)
The Color Purple (1985)
The Goonies (1985)
Gremlins (1984)
D.C. Cab (1983)
48 Hrs. (1982)
Poltergeist (1982)
Raiders of the Lost Ark (1981)
The Final Countdown (1980)
Star Trek: The Motion Picture (1979)
Star Wars (1977)

References

External links
 

American sound editors
Living people
Special Achievement Academy Award winners
Place of birth missing (living people)
Year of birth missing (living people)
Best Sound Editing Academy Award winners
Emmy Award winners